The Directory of International Associations of the Faithful, published by the Dicastery for the Laity, Family and Life, lists the international associations of the faithful in the Catholic Church that have been granted official recognition. It gives the official name, acronym, date of establishment, history, identity, organization, membership, works, publications, and website of the communities and movements.

Recognition of similar national associations as Catholic is granted by the country's Episcopal Conference, and it is for the local bishop to grant recognition to local associations.

List
The following is a list of the international associations that have received recognition, according to the Vatican website, which provides linked descriptions of each organization:

Adsis Communities (Adsis)
Amigonian Cooperators (A.Cs)
Apostolic Movement of Schoenstatt (Schoenstatt Movement)
Bread of Life Community
Catholic Fraternity of Charismatic Covenant Communities and Fellowships (Catholic Fraternity)
Catholic Integrated Community (KIG) 
Catholic International Education Office (OIEC)
Chemin Neuf Community (CCN)
Christian Life Community (CVX) 
Christian Life Movement (CLM) 
Claire Amitié
Community of the Beatitudes
"Comunità Domenico Tardini" Association 
Conference of International Catholic Organisations (CICO)
Cooperators of Opus Dei 
Couples for Christ (CFC) 
Emmanuel Community 
Encounters of Married Couples  (Dialogues)
Encounters of Youth Promotion (EYP) 
Fondacio. Christians for the World (Fondacio)
Foyers de Charité 
Fraternity of Charles de Foucauld (FCF)
Fraternity of Communion and Liberation (CL)
Fraternity of St Thomas Aquinas groups (FASTA)
Heart's Home 
Heralds of the Gospel (EP) 
Holy Family Association
Immaculate Heart of Mary, Mother of Mercy Association or Tuus Totus (CIM)
Institute for World Evangelisation (ICPE Mission) 
Intercontinental Christian Fraternity of the Chronic Sick and Physically Disabled (FCIPMH)
International Alliance of Catholic Knights (IACK)
International Association of "Caterinati"
International Association of Charities (AIC)
International Association of Faith and Light 
International Association of Missionaries of Political Charity 
International Catholic Centre for Cooperation with UNESCO (CCIC)
International Catholic Centre of Geneva (ICCG) 
International Catholic Charismatic Renewal Services (ICCRS)
International Catholic Child Bureau (BICE)
International Catholic Committee for Gypsies (CCIT)
International Catholic Committee of Nurses and Medical Social Assistants (CICIAMS)
International Catholic Conference of Guiding (ICCG)
International Catholic Conference of Scouting (ICCS)
International Catholic Migration Commission (ICMC) 
International Catholic Movement for Intellectual and Cultural Affairs (ICMICA-Pax Romana)
International Catholic Rural Association (ICRA)
International Catholic Society for Girls (ACISJF)
International Catholic Union of the Press (UCIP)
International Christian Union of Business Executives (UNIAPAC)
International Confederation of Professional Associations of Domestic Workers (IAG)
International Confederation of the Volunteers of Suffering Centers (International Confederation CVS)
International Coordination of Young Christian Workers (ICYCW)
International Council of Catholic Men (FIHC-Unum Omnes) 
International Federation of Catholic Associations of the Blind (FIDACA)
International Federation of Catholic Medical Associations (FIAMC)
International Federation of Catholic Parochial Youth Movements (FIMCAP) 
International Federation of Catholic Pharmacists (FIPC) 
International Federation of Catholic Universities (IFCU) 
International Federation of L'Arche Communities (L'Arche International) (L'Arche International)
International Federation of Pueri Cantores (FIPC)
International Federation of Rural Adult Catholic Movements (FIMARC)
International Forum of Catholic Action (IFCA)
International Independent Christian Youth (JICI) 
International Kolping Society (IKS)
International Military Apostolate (AMI)
International Movement of Apostolate in the Independent Social Milieus (MIAMSI)
International Movement of Catholic Agricultural and Rural Youth (MIJARC)
International Movement of Catholic Students (IMCS-Pax Romana)
International Movement of the Apostolate for Children (MIDADE)
International Union of Catholic Esperantists (IKUE)
International Union of Catholic Jurists (UIJC)
International Union of European Guides and Scouts - European scouting Federation (UIGSE-FSE)
International Young Catholic Students (IYCS)
Jesus Youth (JY) 
Lay Claretian Movement (MSC) 
Legion of Mary 
Life Ascending International (VMI) 
Light-Life Movement (RŚŻ) 
"Living In" Spirituality Movement 
Marianist Lay Communities (MLC) 
Memores Domini Lay Association (Memores Domini) 
Militia Christi (MJC) 
Militia of the Immaculata (M.I.) 
Missionary Community of Villaregia (CMV)
Missionary Contemplative Movement "P. de Foucauld"
Oasis Movement 
"Pope John XXIII Community" Association
Prayer and Life Workshops (TOV) 
Pro Deo et fratribus—Family of Mary (PDF-FM) 
Promoting Group of the Movement for a Better World (PG of the MBW)
Regnum Christi Apostolic Movement 
Salesian Cooperators Association (ACS)
Salesian Youth Movement (SYM) 
Sanguis Christi Union (USC)
Sant'Egidio Community
Schoenstatt Women's Apostolic Union 
School of the Cross
Secular Missionary Carmel (CMS) 
"Seguimi" Lay Group of Human-Christian Promotion 
Sermig
Shalom Catholic Community 
Silent Workers of the Cross Association (SODC)
St Benedict Patron of Europe Association (ASBPE)
International Confederation of the Society of St Vincent de Paul (SSVP)
St Francis de Sales Association 
Teams of Our Lady (END) 
Teresian Apostolic Movement (TAM)
Teresian Association (T.A.) 
Union of Catholic Apostolate (UAC)
Work of Mary (Focolare Movement)
Work of Nazareth (ODN) 
Work of Saint John of Avila
Work of Saint Teresa
World Catholic Association for Communication (SIGNIS)
World Confederation of the Past Pupils of Mary Help of Christians 
World Federation of Nocturnal Adoration Societies
World Movement of Christian Workers (WMCW)
World Organisation of Former Pupils of Catholic Education (OMAEC)
World Organisation of the Cursillo Movement (OMCC) 
World Union of Catholic Teachers (WUCT) 
World Union of Catholic Women's Organisations (WUCWO)
Worldwide Marriage Encounter (WWME)

Other international associations of the faithful
Although not yet included in the latest available edition of the Directory, the Neocatechumenal Way received its definitive approval from the Pontifical Council for the Laity on 11 May 2008.

References

External links 
 New Communities and Movements

International associations of the faithful